Aluminium cyanide is a metallic cyanide. The chemical formula is Al(CN)3. Aluminium cyanide was produced as an ammoniate by reacting aluminium metal with mercuric cyanide in liquid ammonia. Aluminium cyanide is destroyed by water to form aluminium hydroxide.

References

Cyanides
Aluminium compounds